Hanna Kohonen (née Johanna Rönkkö; 11 October 1885 – 22 February 1944) was a female Social Democratic Party of Finland politician. She was a member of the Parliament of Finland from 1916 to 1918. She supported the Reds in the Finnish Civil War of 1918. After the Red side was defeated, she fled to Soviet Russia. She initially settled in Petrozavodsk, in the Karelian ASSR. In 1938, she was arrested by the Soviet authorities and deported to the Kazakh Soviet Socialist Republic, where she died.

References

Sources
 
 KASNTn NKVDn vuosina 1937–1938 rankaisemien Suomen Eduskunnan entisten jäsenten luettelo

1885 births
1944 deaths
People from Iisalmi
People from Kuopio Province (Grand Duchy of Finland)
Social Democratic Party of Finland politicians
Communist Party of Finland politicians
Members of the Parliament of Finland (1916–17)
Members of the Parliament of Finland (1917–19)
People of the Finnish Civil War (Red side)
Great Purge victims from Finland
Soviet rehabilitations